The 2018 SMU Mustangs football team represented Southern Methodist University in the 2018 NCAA Division I FBS football season. The Mustangs played their home games at Gerald J. Ford Stadium in Dallas, Texas and competed in the West Division of the American Athletic Conference. They were led by first-year coach Sonny Dykes. They finished the season 5–7, 4–4 in American Athletic play to finish in fourth place in the West Division.

Previous season
The Mustangs finished the 2017 season 7–6, 4–4 in AAC play to finish in a tie for third place in the West Division. They were invited to the Frisco Bowl where they lost to Louisiana Tech. The Mustangs were led by third-year coach Chad Morris during the entire regular season until December 6, when he resigned to become the head coach at Arkansas. On December 11, SMU hired Sonny Dykes as head coach, and he led them in their bowl game.

Preseason

Award watch lists
Listed in the order that they were released

AAC media poll
The AAC media poll was released on July 24, 2018, with the Mustangs predicted to finish in fourth place in the AAC West Division.

Schedule

Schedule Source:

Roster

Game summaries

at North Texas

To start the 2018 season, the Mustangs traveled to Denton, Texas to take on the Mean Green in the 38th Safeway Bowl.

SMU received the opening kickoff and started at their own 25-yard line. Ben Hicks completed a 6-yard pass to C. J. Sanders for the Mustangs' first offensive play. On the next play, SMU was backed up 5-yards after a false start penalty against Larry Hughes, making it 3rd and 9. On third down, Hicks was sacked by E.J. Ejiya for a 10-yard loss to bring up 4th and 19 and the Mustangs were forced to punt. Before the punt, SMU was backed up another 5-yards due to a delay of game penalty. Jaelon Darden received the punt for North Texas, returning it 4-yard to the SMU 49-yard line. Following a Mason Fine sack and an offensive holding penalty, the Mean Green were backed up to their own 49-yard line on 3rd and 25, but a personal foul against Trevor Denbow moved North Texas up to the SMU 36-yard line with an automatic first down. Three plays later, Mason Fine found Jalen Guyton for a 15-yard touchdown pass. The two teams punted on their next drives after both went three and out. On the first play following North Texas's punt, Hicks was intercepted by Kemon Hall who returned it 36-yard for a pick six touchdown. The Mustangs punted three more times before halftime, while the Mean Green punted once and scored six more points with Cole Hedlund making two field goals.

North Texas received the second half kickoff and started at their own 25-yard line. The Mean Green ended the drive with a 5-yard touchdown pass from Mason Fine to Nic Smith. The Mustangs punted on their next three drives, while North Texas scored another touchdown and made another field goal, extending the lead to 36–0. On their 4th drive of the game, the Mean Green turned the ball over on downs at the SMU 37-yard line. On the 5th play following the turnover on downs, Hicks found Jr. Robinson for a 37-yard pass, putting the Mustangs at the North Texas 5-yard line. On the next play, Braeden West found the end zone on a 5-yard run, giving SMU its first score of the game. On the next drive, Hedlund made a 51-yard field goal to make it 39–7. On the kickoff, Sanders returned the kick 23-yards to the SMU 26-yard line. On the 4th play of the drive, Hicks found James Proche for a 59-yard touchdown pass; the Mustangs made the two-point conversion to trail 15–39 with 1:41 left to play. On the following kickoff, DeAndre Torrey returned Kevin Roblebo's kick 96-yards for a touchdown. On the next drive, Hicks made another long touchdown pass, this time a 71-yard pass to West. Receiving the ball back, the Mean Green took a knee to end the game.

The Mustangs' offense was shutout through the first three quarters, getting their first score of the game on a five-yard run from Braeden West with just over 8 minutes left in the game. SMU only had 256 yards of total offense, while North Texas had 529. SMU's defense couldn't stop Mean Green quarterback Mason Fine, who threw for 444 yards and 3 touchdowns.

TCU

Kickoff was scheduled for 7:00 p.m., but was delayed due to lightning in the area. The delay lasted for nearly 2 hours, with kickoff happening at 8:59 p.m.

The Mustangs received the opening kickoff, starting at their own 25-yard line. Following a 10-yard run, quarterback Ben Hicks had to sit out a play after losing his helmet. On the following play, running back Braeden West went 51-yards for a touchdown to take an early 7–0 lead following Will Moore's kick. The Horned Frogs started the following drive at their own 30-yard line. TCU made it to their own 45-yard line, but quarterback Shawn Robinson fumbled the ball on a play for a loss of 2-yards following the recovery. On 3rd and 14 at the TCU 41, Robinson threw an incomplete pass that was almost intercepted. Reggie Roberson Jr. returned Adam Nunez's punt to the TCU 10-yard line, but an illegal block in the back against SMU forced the offense to start at their own 25-yard line. Making it to the TCU 41-yard line, Hicks was sacked on 3rd and 10, forcing the Mustangs to punt. The Horned Frogs started their next drive at their own 10-yard line. TCU made it 18-yards to the 28-yard line, but were forced to punt. On the punt, Nunez fumbled the ball, with the ball rolling out of the end zone for a safety. Following the safety, the Mustangs' next drive ended in a punt. The Horned Frogs started at their own 2-yard line, making it to the SMU 31-yard line. On 4th and 7, TCU kicker Cole Bunce missed a 48-yard field goal, with the ball bouncing off of the center post. TCU got its first touchdown of the game in the 2nd quarter with a 78-yard punt return from KaVontae Turpin. The Horned Frogs scored on their next drive when running back Sewo Olonilua ran the ball 24-yards, but fumbled; the fumble was recovered in the end zone by Jaelan Austin for a touchdown, giving TCU its first lead of the game. To close out the first half, SMU kicker Kevin Robledo made a 49-yard field goal.

TCU received the second half kickoff and made it all the way to the SMU 24-yard line, but a Robinson pass was intercepted by Shaine Hailey. On the second play of the next drive, Hicks fumbled the football, which was recovered by Alec Dunham, who returned it 25-yards for a touchdown. The Horned Frogs continued to extend their lead on their next offensive drive, with Robinson running 18-yards for a touchdown. The Mustangs failed to score in the second half, while the Horned Frogs scored 28 points.

SMU only had 242 yards of total offense, while TCU had 387. The Horned Frogs turned the ball over twice, while the Mustangs only committed one turnover.

at Michigan

Navy

Houston Baptist

at UCF

at Tulane

Cincinnati

Houston

at UConn

Memphis

at Tulsa

References

SMU
SMU Mustangs football seasons
SMU Mustangs football